Richard Berney MP for Norwich.

Richard Berney may also refer to:

Sir Richard Berney, 1st Baronet (d. 1668) of the Berney baronets
Sir Richard Berney, 3rd Baronet (d. 1706) of the Berney baronets
Sir Richard Berney, 4th Baronet (1688–1710) of the Berney baronets

See also
Berney (surname)